Ab Owain is a Celtic  surname from the Welsh ab Owain meaning "son of Owen" (Owen meaning 'noble')

List of people surnamed ab Owain 
 Cadwgan ab Owain (died 951), joint king of Glywysing in Wales, brother of Gruffydd
 Einion ab Owain (died c. 984), prince of the House of Dinefwr, in Wales
 Gruffydd ab Owain (died 935), joint king of Glywysing in Wales, brother of Cadwgan
 Gwenwynwyn ab Owain (died c. 1216), king in central Wales 
 Hywel ab Owain (died 1043), king of a part of Glywysing in Wales
 Ieuan Ddu ab Dafydd ab Owain (fl. 1440–1480), Welsh poet
 Maredudd ab Owain (died 999), 10th-century king in Wales
 Morgan Hen ab Owain (died 974), king of Gwent, Wales
 Rhys ab Owain (died 1078), king of Deheubarth in southern Wales
 Robin Llwyd ab Owain (born 1959), Welsh poet and author

See also
 Ab Owen
 Bowen (surname)
 Bowens (surname)
 Bown
 Bowne
 Bownes
 Owen (name)
 Owens (surname)

References

Surnames
Surnames of Welsh origin
Surnames of British Isles origin